The 2006–07 Professional Golf Tour of India was the inaugural season of the Professional Golf Tour of India.

Ashok Kumar was the first Professional Golf Tour of India Order of Merit winner, having won five events during the season.

Schedule
The following table lists official events during the 2006–0 season.

Order of Merit
The Order of Merit was based on prize money won during the season, calculated in Indian rupees.

Notes

References

2006-07
2006 in golf
2007 in golf